Route 255 is a collector road in the Canadian province of Nova Scotia.

It is located in the Cape Breton Regional Municipality beginning in Glace Bay at Trunk 28 and continuing along Commercial Street through the downtown area then southeast on Brookside Street exiting the town. Route 255 continues through the communities of Port Caledonia (locally known as Big Glace Bay), Port Morien, Homeville, and Mira Gut, where it turns in a westward direction through Hornes Road to link with Trunk 22. Route 255 is part of the Marconi Trail which runs from Glace Bay to Louisbourg.

Communities
Glace Bay
Port Morien
Mira Gut
Hornes Road

Museums
Miners Museum

See also
List of Nova Scotia provincial highways

References

Nova Scotia provincial highways
Roads in the Cape Breton Regional Municipality